Hellinsia quitus is a moth of the family Pterophoridae. It is found in Ecuador.

References

Moths described in 2011
Quitus
Fauna of Ecuador
Pterophoridae of South America
Moths of South America